The American Music Award for Favorite Female Artist – Soul/R&B has been awarded since 1974. Years reflect the year during which the awards were presented, for works released in the previous year (until 2003 onward, when awards were handed out on November of the same year). Beyoncé and Rihanna are tied for the most wins in this category, with 7 wins. Beyoncé is the most nominated artist, with 11 nominations.

Winners and nominees

1970s

1980s

1990s

2000s

2010s

2020s

Category facts

Multiple wins

 7 wins
 Rihanna
 Beyoncé

 4 wins
 Mariah Carey
 Aretha Franklin

 3 wins
 Anita Baker
 Whitney Houston
 Diana Ross

Multiple nominations

 12 nominations
 Beyoncé

 10 nominations
 Rihanna

 9 nominations
 Mariah Carey

 8 nominations
 Janet Jackson
 Aretha Franklin
 Whitney Houston

 7 nominations
 Mary J. Blige

 5 nominations
 Anita Baker
 Toni Braxton
 Natalie Cole
 Diana Ross

See also

 List of music awards honoring women

References

American Music Awards
Rhythm and blues
Music awards honoring women
Awards established in 1974
1974 establishments in the United States